Lac à la Chute (English: Lake of the Fall) is a freshwater body on the hydrographic side of rivière à la Chute, located in the unorganized territory of Lac-Jacques-Cartier, in the MRC La Côte-de-Beaupré Regional County Municipality, Quebec, Canada.

Lac à la Chute is located in Jacques-Cartier National Park. Its southern half is located in the canton of Cauchon.

The Lac à la Chute watershed is mainly served on the east side by the route 175 which links the cities of Quebec City and Saguenay. A few secondary roads serve this area for forestry and recreational tourism activities.

Forestry is the main economic activity in the sector; recreotourism activities, second.

The surface of Lac de la Chute is generally frozen from the beginning of December to the end of March; safe circulation on the ice is generally done from the end of December to the beginning of March.

Geography 
This lake sunk between the mountains is made in length, resembling a woolen sock whose part of the toes is oriented towards the northeast.

From the mouth of Lac à la Chute, the current goes consecutively first to the outlet of the lake over  generally towards the southwest in a deep valley; on  southwards following the course of the rivière à la Chute; on  towards the southwest by following the course of the Sautauriski River; then on  generally towards the south along the current of the Jacques-Cartier River to the northeast bank of the Saint-Laurent river.

It is the second largest of the 216 bodies of water in Jacques-Cartier National Park.

Toponymy 
The toponym "lac à la Chute" is directly linked to the rivière à la Chute into which the outlet of the lake flows. This denomination appears on cartographic documents at least since the end of the 19th century, in particular - in the form "L. at the Fall" - on the map of "Parc National des Laurentides" dating from April 30, 1896.

The toponym lac de la chute was formalized on December 5, 1968, by the Commission de toponymie du Québec.

See also 

 Jacques-Cartier National Park
 La Côte-de-Beaupré Regional County Municipality
 Lac-Jacques-Cartier, an unorganized territory
 Rivière à la Chute
 Sautauriski River
 Jacques-Cartier River
 List of lakes of Canada

Notes and references

Bibliography 
.

External links 
Jacques-Cartier National Park web site

Lakes of Capitale-Nationale
La Côte-de-Beaupré Regional County Municipality